Mahmoud Salim Za'tara is a Jordanian professional footballer who plays as a striker for Jordanian Pro League club Al-Jazeera and the Jordan national team.

International career
Za'tara's first match with the Jordan national senior team was against Uzbekistan in an international friendly in Amman on 13 August 2012, which Jordan lost 1–0.

Career statistics

International

References

External links 
 
 

1991 births
Living people
Sportspeople from Amman
Jordanian footballers
Jordan international footballers
Jordanian people of Palestinian descent
Association football forwards
2015 AFC Asian Cup players
Footballers at the 2010 Asian Games
Muaither SC players
Jordanian expatriate sportspeople in Kuwait
Expatriate footballers in Kuwait
Al Salmiya SC players
Al-Faisaly SC players
Al-Wehdat SC players
Suwaiq Club players
Al-Arabi (Jordan) players
Al-Yarmouk FC (Jordan) players
Busaiteen Club players
Expatriate footballers in Qatar
Jordanian expatriate sportspeople in Bahrain
Expatriate footballers in Bahrain
Jordanian expatriate sportspeople in Oman
Expatriate footballers in Oman
Jordanian expatriate footballers
Qatar Stars League players
Qatari Second Division players
Asian Games competitors for Jordan
Al-Ahli SC (Amman) players
Al-Jazeera (Jordan) players
Al-Salt SC players
Jordanian Pro League players
Kuwait Premier League players